Soldotna Airport  is a city-owned, public use airport located one nautical mile (1.85 km) southeast of the central business district of Soldotna, Alaska.

Facilities 
The airport is located along the south bank of the Kenai River in the southeastern corner of Soldotna city limits, and also adjoins the Kenai National Wildlife Refuge.  Road access to the airport is via Funny River Road, a short distance east of its intersection with the Sterling Highway.

It has one runway designated 7/25 with an asphalt surface measuring 5,000 by 132 feet (1,524 x 40 m).

For the 12-month period ending December 31, 2006, the airport had 15,050 aircraft operations, an average of 41 per day: 80% general aviation, 20% air taxi, and <1% military. At that time there were 47 aircraft based at this airport: 92% single-engine, 2% multi-engine and 6% ultralight.

Airline and destinations 
During the late 1970s and early 1980s, Alaska Aeronautical Industries (AAI), a commuter air carrier, was operating scheduled passenger service to Anchorage (ANC) with de Havilland Canada DHC-6 Twin Otter turboprop aircraft. North Pacific Airlines (NPA), a commuter air carrier, operated scheduled passenger service to Anchorage during the early and mid-1980s with Beechcraft aircraft. In 1987, South Central Air (SCA), also a commuter air carrier, was operating scheduled passenger service between the airport and Anchorage flying as Western Express on behalf of Western Airlines via a code sharing agreement with Piper Chieftain twin prop aircraft. By 1988, South Central Air was continuing to serve Soldotna on an independent basis with flights to Anchorage, and by 1989 service to Anchorage was being operated by another small commuter air carrier, Inlet Airlines.  The airport currently does not have any scheduled passenger air service.

The airport also served as the hub for Rediske Air, a local air taxi air carrier.

Aviation accidents and incidents
All nine on board (seven passengers and two flight crew) were killed.
On July 7, 2013, an air taxi crashed, killing all ten people on board.  The single-engine de Havilland Canada DHC-3 Otter, registered to Rediske Air of nearby Nikiski, had a pilot and nine passengers aboard.

References

External links

Airports in Kenai Peninsula Borough, Alaska